Taljai is a hill located in the heart of Pune, India that has been designated as a wildlife reserve. The road to this hill passes through the Shivaji Maratha College campus with a picturesque mountain path, with sharp turns. Near the entrance of the forest is a temple to the hill's namesake Taljai mata; a Hindu goddess.  

The reserve attracts migratory birds and is  home to peacocks. The location is therefore popular with amateur bird watchers and ornithologists.
A recent study concluded that the lake at Taljai is dying due to dumping of plastic waste.facing issues to maintain its original form due to urbanization. Several organisations are running campaigns to raise the issue. 
The park is open for visitors from 5 to 10 in the mornings and from 4:30 to 7:00 in the evenings. Vehicles are prohibited in the area.

References

Tourist attractions in Pune
Hills of Pune
Hindu temples in Maharashtra